Carnegie Station (25°47'45.0"S 122°58'31.1"E), or Carnegie pastoral lease, is located north of Laverton and east of Wiluna in Western Australia and is the most eastern of pastoral leases found on  the Gunbarrel Highway.

In some sources it is identified as Carnegie, with the features including a homestead, outstation, outcamp, woolshed, and Aboriginal outstation.

The area of the station is also within the Wiluna Native Title Claim area, also known as the Martu claim that was clarified in 2013.

Located on the western edge of the Gibson Desert and the southern edge of the Little Sandy Desert, it is situated on the eastern side of the Lady Lawley Range, north of Lake Carnegie and is found at the western terminus of the original Gunbarrel Highway.

The history of the station is related to the history of the Linke family.

Due to its isolated location, artefacts from explorers and earlier travels are known to have been observed or found in the station area, as well as more recently, lost or ill-equipped travellers in the area.

Notes

Homesteads in Western Australia
Pastoral leases in Western Australia
Stations (Australian agriculture)
Goldfields-Esperance